The 2021 European Trampoline Championships was held from 29 April to 2 May 2021 in Sochi, Russia.

Medal summary

Seniors

Juniors

Medal table

References

2021 in gymnastics
2021
International gymnastics competitions hosted by Russia
2021 in Russian sport
Sports competitions in Sochi
April 2021 sports events in Russia
May 2021 sports events in Russia